In geometry, a vertex  is an angle (shape) associated with a vertex of an n-dimensional polytope. In two dimensions it refers to the angle formed by two intersecting lines, such as at a "corner" (vertex) of a polygon. In higher dimensions there can be more than two lines (edges) meeting at a vertex, making a description of the angle shape more complicated.

In three dimensions and three-dimensional polyhedra, a vertex angle is a polyhedral angle or n-hedral angle. It is described by a sequence of n face angles, which are the angles formed by two edges of polyhedron meeting at the vertex, or by a sequence of n dihedral angles, which are the angles between two faces sharing the vertex. The angle may be quantified using a single number by the interior solid angle at the vertex (the spherical excess), which is related to the sum of the dihedral angles, or by the angular defect (or excess) of the vertex, which is related to the sum of the face angles, or other metrics such as the polar sine. The simplest type of polyhedral angle is a trihedral angle or trihedron (bounded by three planes), as found at the vertices of a Parallelepiped or tetrahedron.

For higher-dimensional polytopes, a vertex angle can be quantified using a higher-dimensional solid angle, i.e. by the portion of the n-sphere around the vertex that is interior to the polytope. Face and dihedral angles also generalize to higher dimensions.

The term vertex angle is sometimes used synonymously with face angle, i.e. the angle between two edges meeting at a vertex. It may also refer to the (higher-dimensional) interior solid angle at a vertex.

Properties
A vertex angle in a polygon is often measured on the interior side of the vertex. For any simple n-gon, the sum of the interior angles is π(n − 2) radians or 180(n − 2) degrees.

The face and dihedral angles of a polyhedral angle can be related to each other by interpreting the polyhedral angle as a spherical polygon, whose side lengths are the face angles and whose vertex angles are the dihedral angles; the surface area of the polygon is the solid angle of the vertex (see spherical trigonometry, in particular the spherical law of cosines).

The higher dimensional analogue of a right angle is the vertex angle formed by mutually perpendicular edges, such as at the vertex of a hypercube. In three dimensions such an angle can be found in a trirectangular tetrahedron or a corner reflector.

See also 
 Complementary angles
 Supplementary angles
 Dihedral angle
 Polar sine
Solid angle

References 

Euclidean geometry
Angle